In a Sentimental Mood: Mathis Sings Ellington is an album by American pop singer Johnny Mathis that was released on October 9, 1990, by Columbia Records and continues the studio album pattern that began with The Hollywood Musicals and In the Still of the Night in which the song selections adhere to a specific theme or focus.

In 1992 this project earned Mathis a Grammy nomination in the category of Best Traditional Pop Vocal Album, his first nod from the National Academy of Recording Arts and Sciences in over 30 years. His only previous nomination was for "Misty" in the category of Best Male Pop Vocal Performance.

This is the first Mathis album whose release did not include the LP record format, which was discontinued earlier in the year.

History
As Mathis looked back at the vocalists that he admired the most, such as Nat King Cole and Lena Horne, he felt that some of their best performances were evoked by the music of Duke Ellington. "'I wanted,'" he said, "'to make an intimate, close, hands-on portrait of this great man and his great music. And I wanted to get it right -- to keep that feeling alive in a way that was completely honest and true.'"

Several elements came together to provide that feeling that Mathis was seeking for this project, one of the more blatant examples being the trumpet work of Bill Berry, a one-time member of the Duke Ellington Orchestra. There were, however, production factors to work around, especially with regard to the fact that the vocal track was not going to be recorded separately. "The London Symphony players that we wanted were only available to us five days in the morning at 10 o'clock." This created a different type of recording schedule for Mathis. "I had to get up at 5 or 6 AM just to get my voice in some kind of shape to sing that early. But there was such a warm, wonderful feeling... even at that hour of the morning -- that I knew we were making the right decision."

The original takes from these sessions were used for about half of the tracks on the finished product. Mathis explained, "'I wanted to get some first, second and third takes with the orchestra because of the wonderful sound from this church in Petersham.'" The latest technology allowed him to complete the vocal tracks back in the US. "'I sang four or five back here. They use an amazing computer that can match the sound and the timbre of the room.'" The greatest challenge of this particular music, however, was left to the singer. "'I've sung Ellington's music in the past,'" he said. "'It was hard to sing then, and to this day it's still very difficult music. But it rewards the effort–oh, does it ever reward the effort.'"

Reception

Although the album did not make it onto Billboard magazine's  Top Pop Albums chart, Allmusic's Dave Nathan writes in his retrospective review that "the music remains as absorbing and enticing as if it were arranged by Ellington himself." He says regarding Mathis that "he has lost none of that special taste and phrasing which made his records consistently favored by a wide segment of the listening public," and, "He still delivers each song with emotional intensity and personal intimacy."

Track listing

 "Overture – A Musical Tribute to Duke Ellington" (Byron Olson) – 2:16
Fred Hersch – piano solo 
 Byron Olson – arranger 
 "Lush Life" (Billy Strayhorn) – 4:15
 Byron Olson – arranger 
Medley – 4:47  a. "Don't You Know I Care (Don't You Care I Know)" (Mack David, D. Ellington)  b. "I Didn't Know About You" (D. Ellington, Bob Russell)
 Brad Dechter – arranger 
 "Things Ain't What They Used to Be" (instrumental) (Mercer Ellington, Ted Persons) – 1:17
 Brad Dechter – arranger 
 "In a Sentimental Mood" (D. Ellington, Manny Kurtz, Irving Mills) – 4:05
Fred Hersch – piano solo 
 Byron Olson – arranger 
 "What Am I Here For" (D. Ellington, Frankie Lane) – 4:22
 Bill Berry – trumpeter 
 Brad Dechter – arranger 
 "I Got It Bad (and That Ain't Good)" (instrumental) (D. Ellington, Paul Francis Webster) – 1:43
 "Something to Live For" (D. Ellington, Billy Strayhorn) – 3:37
 Ronnie Ross – baritone sax soloist 
 Byron Olson – arranger 
 "Solitude" (Eddie DeLange, D. Ellington, Irving Mills) – 3:40
 Byron Olson – arranger 
 "Perdido" (instrumental) (Ervin Drake, Hans Lengsfelder, Juan Tizol) – 1:05
 Brad Dechter – arranger 
 "Prelude to a Kiss" (D. Ellington, Irving Gordon, Irving Mills) – 2:52
 Brad Dechter – arranger 
 "In a Mellow Tone" (D. Ellington, Milt Gabler) – 3:19
 Brad Dechter – arranger 
 "Don't Get Around Much Anymore" (D. Ellington, Bob Russell) – 3:16
 Brad Dechter – arranger 
 "Satin Doll" (instrumental) (D. Ellington) – 1:07
 "Come Sunday" (D. Ellington) – 3:24
 Brad Dechter – arranger 
 "Do Nothing till You Hear from Me" (D. Ellington, Bob Russell) – 4:39
 Brad Dechter – arranger 
 "Caravan" (instrumental) (D. Ellington, Irving Mills, Juan Tizol) – 0:54
 "Day Dream" (D. Ellington, John La Touche, Billy Strayhorn) – 3:26
 Byron Olson – arranger

Personnel
From the liner notes for the original album:

Johnny Mathis – vocals
Mike Berniker – producer 
Jay Landers – executive producer
Harry Rabinowitz – conductor
Bill Berry – trumpet 
Fred Hersch – piano
Ronnie Ross – baritone sax 
Keith Grant – recording engineer
Jerry O'Reardon – assistant engineer
Tim Geelan – remix engineer
Vlado Meller – mastering engineer
Don Heckman – liner notes
Nancy Donald – art direction
George Hurrell – photographer

References

Bibliography

1990 albums
Johnny Mathis albums
Columbia Records albums